The Sault Ste. Marie Canal is a National Historic Site in Sault Ste. Marie, Ontario, and is part of the national park system, managed by Parks Canada. It includes a lock to bypass the rapids on the St. Marys River.

The first canal near the site was built in 1798, but was destroyed in 1814 during the War of 1812. The present canal dates to 1895, and formed part of the shipping route from the Atlantic Ocean to Lake Superior, along with the two locks on the US side of the river. One of the walls of the lock collapsed in 1987 and the canal was closed to traffic.

In 1998 a smaller lock was opened within the original canal. It is suitable for smaller boats and mostly used for pleasure craft.

History 
The first lock was completed in 1798 by the North West Company. On July 20, 1814, an American force destroyed the North West Company depot on the north shore of the St. Marys River. Since the Americans were unable to capture Fort Michilimackinac, the British forces retained control of the Sault. The lock was destroyed in 1814 in an attack by U.S. forces during the War of 1812.

In 1870, the United States refused the steamer Chicora, carrying Colonel Garnet Wolseley permission to pass through the locks at Sault Ste Marie. The Wolseley Expedition incident led to the construction of a Canadian Sault Ste. Marie Canal, which was completed in 1895.  This event is now known as the Chicora Incident.

The construction of the canal and lock was completed in 1895. At that time it was the largest lock and first electrically operated lock in the world.

On June 9, 1909, the locks were seriously damaged when the Perry G. Walker, owned by the Gilchrist Transportation Co. of Cleveland, Ohio, crashed into the south main gate, forcing it back and allowing the force of water to push the north main gate over.  The rush of water threw the Perry G. Walker back and carried two other ships downstream, one of which struck the south main gate, breaking it diagonally in two. The rush of water through the destroyed locks was stopped by activation of the Emergency Swing Dam, allowing repairs to commence.  Amazingly, there was no loss of life or injury associated with this disaster, and repairs required only 12 days, with the bridge reopening on June 21, 1909.

Due to a wall failure in 1987, the historic lock was shut down indefinitely. The canal is used for recreational and tour boats; major shipping traffic uses the U.S. locks.

Heritage Designation 
The canal was designated a National Historic Site in 1987, and is managed by Parks Canada as a unit of the national park system. It welcomes recreational boating and land-based visitors. There are several heritage buildings on the site: the administration building, the superintendent's residence, the canalmen's shelter, the powerhouse and the blacksmith shop, all constructed from red sandstone dug up during the canal's construction. Most of the original machinery used to operate the lock is also still in place. Another unique feature of the site is the Sault Canal Emergency Swing Dam, the only emergency swing dam left in existence, and the only one to ever be used in an emergency.

Guided tours are available in the summer only. The visitor centre is open Mid-June to Mid-October.

The Red River Expedition of 1870, a National Historic Event, portaged nearby, prior to the canal's construction, and was the major reason for its creation.

See also
 List of national historic sites of Canada
 Soo Locks - Locks on the U.S. side of St. Marys River
 Whitefish Island

References

External links

 Official Sault Ste. Marie Canal website

St. Marys River (Michigan–Ontario)
Canals in Ontario
Ship canals
Great Lakes Waterway
National Historic Sites in Ontario
Transport museums in Ontario
Canal museums
Museums in Sault Ste. Marie, Ontario
Buildings and structures in Sault Ste. Marie, Ontario
Canals opened in 1895
1895 establishments in Ontario
North West Company